"It's Always Been You" is a song by American contemporary Christian musician Phil Wickham. The song was released on May 14, 2021, by Fair Trade Services as the first promotional single from his eighth studio album, Hymn of Heaven (2021). Wickham co-wrote the song with Ran Jackson and Ricky Jackson. Ran Jackson and Ricky Jackson produced the song.

"It's Always Been You" peaked at No. 27 on the US Hot Christian Songs chart.

Background
On May 12, 2021, Phil Wickham announced that "It's Always Been You" will be released on May 14, 2021, as the next song to promote his upcoming album Hymn of Heaven slated for June 25.

Composition

Accolades

Commercial performance
"It's Always Been You" debuted at No. 27 on the US Hot Christian Songs chart dated May 29, 2021, concurrently charting at No. 4 on the Christian Digital Song Sales chart.

Music videos
The official music video as well as the lyric video of "It's Always Been You" were both published on Phil Wickham's YouTube channel on May 14, 2021.

Charts

Release history

References

External links
 

2021 songs
2021 singles
Contemporary Christian songs
Phil Wickham songs
Songs written by Phil Wickham